Cheslyn may refer to:

Richard Cheslyn (1797–1858), English amateur cricketer
Cheslyn Jampies (born 1990), South African soccer player

See also
Cheslyn Hay, civil parish in Staffordshire, England
Listed buildings in Cheslyn Hay
Wyrley and Cheslyn Hay railway station (1858–1965)
Cheslyn Hay Academy, mixed secondary school in Cheslyn Hay